This is a list of television-related events that occurred prior to 1925.



Global television events

Births

Births (before 1900)

Births (1900–1909)

Births (1910–1919)

Births (1920–1924)

See also 
 Table of years in television

References

1900s

fr:1900 à la télévision